The Darby Crash Band was a music project started by Darby Crash and Pat Smear, founding members of Los Angeles punk rock band the Germs, formed after the Germs split in 1980. They recruited bassist David "Bosco" Danford and Circle Jerks drummer Lucky Lehrer and began playing shows in Los Angeles. The group's setlists would include a number of well-known songs from the Germs' archives, as well as newly written material. The band never recorded and played only a small number of shows before Crash's death on December 7, 1980.

There are no studio recordings available. However, a digitally remastered live recording of the band playing at the Starwood, in West Hollywood, is due for release on CD format.

Band members
 Darby Crash (vocals)
 Pat Smear (guitar)
 David "Bosco" Danford (bass)
 Lucky Lehrer (drums)

External links
 Official CD Release Page on MySpace
 The Germs Official Website
 David "Bosco" Danford Page

Musical groups from Los Angeles